The Topkapi Dagger is an emerald-studded curved dagger, a jambiya, of mid-18th-century origin. It is preserved and publicly displayed at the treasury of the Topkapi Palace Museum in Istanbul, Turkey. One side of the handle of the dagger is set with three large Colombian emeralds whose size and prominence make it an outstanding and valuable object. It is also decorated with many small diamonds.

The dagger was one of several valuable gifts that was carried by an embassy of Sultan Mahmud I (1730–54) to the Shah of Iran but returned when the then Shah Nadir Shah was assassinated before it could be delivered.

A fictional plot to steal the dagger became the theme of the 1964 film Topkapi.

References 

Daggers
Turkish culture